Pedro Fernández de Velasco, 3rd Duke of Frías (c. 1485 –  10 November 1559), Grandee of Spain (in full) was a Spanish nobleman.

Fernández de Velasco was the son of Íñigo Fernández de Velasco, 2nd Duke of Frías and of Doña María de Tovar, Lady of Berlanga. He married his cousin Doña Juliana de Velasco y Aragón, 1st Countess of Castilnovo, daughter of Bernardino Fernández de Velasco, 1st Duke of Frías in 1508, but they had no issue. He succeeded as 3rd Duke of Frias in 1528.

After 1559, Pedro's nephew, Iñigo, was known as Iñigo II Fernandez de Velasco, 4th Duke of Frias.

Sources

1460 births
1528 deaths
103
105
Pedro
Pedro 03
Grandees of Spain